Polly James was an American screenwriter and TV writer active in the 1940s and 1950s. Much of her work was in the Western genre. For many years she lived with sculptor Nína Sæmundsson on Camrose Drive near the Hollywood Bowl.

She was a member of the Screen Writers Guild.

Selected filmography

Television 
 Sugarfoot (1 episode; 1959)
 Casey Jones (1 episode; 1957)
 The Adventures of Jim Bowie (3 episodes; 1957)
 Annie Oakley (1 episode; 1956)
 The Roy Rogers Show (1 episode; 1956)
 The Adventures of Champion (1 episode; 1956)
 The Millionaire (1 episode; 1955)
 The Gene Autry Show (5 episodes; 1950–52)
 The Lone Ranger (3 episodes; 1949–50)

Film 
 The Redhead from Wyoming (1953)
 The Raiders (1952)
 Mrs. Parkington (1944)

References 

American screenwriters
American women screenwriters
20th-century American writers
20th-century American women writers